Andra Gavrilović (11 July 1864, in Svilajnac, Principality of Serbia – 24 February 1929, in Belgrade, Kingdom of Yugoslavia) was Serbian historian, historian of literature, writer and diplomat.

He also specialized in works of Dositej Obradović.

Gavrilović disagreed with opinion of Jovan Tomić that figure of Djemo the Mountaineer was based on Jegen Osman Pasha. In his polemic work 'Who wasn't Djemo the Mountaineer, correction of someone's literary-historical mistake'. he emphasized that Djemo was in fact Albanian nobleman Gjin Muzaki because he assumed that Serbian epic poetry about struggle between Marko Kraljević and Djemo the Mountaneer was based on real struggles between Prince Marko and Muzaka family from Albania.

According to Andra Gavrilović the figure of Vuča General is based on Tanush Dukagjin, a member of Dukagjini noble family from Albania.

References 

20th-century Serbian historians
Serbian writers
1864 births
1929 deaths